was a  after Wadō and before Yōrō. This period spanned the years from September 715 through November 717.

Change of era
 715 ; 715: The new era name was created to mark the beginning of the reign of Empress Genshō. The previous era ended and the new one commenced in Wadō 8, on the 3rd day of the 9th month of 715.

Events of the Reiki era
 715 (Reiki 1): Empress Gemmei abdicates; and her daughter receives the succession (senso). Shortly thereafter, Empress Genshō formally accedes to the throne (sokui). Emperor Mommu, Genshō's father, had died in 707, but his son (her brother) was deemed too young to receive the succession (senso); and instead, the mother of the male heir formally acceded to the throne (sokui) as Empress Gemmei until her son would grow mature enough to accept senso and sokui. The future Emperor Shōmu's sister undertook a similar responsibility as Empress Genshō.

Notes

References
 Brown, Delmer M. and Ichirō Ishida, eds. (1979).  Gukanshō: The Future and the Past. Berkeley: University of California Press. ;  OCLC 251325323
 Nussbaum, Louis-Frédéric and Käthe Roth. (2005).  Japan encyclopedia. Cambridge: Harvard University Press. ;  OCLC 58053128
 Titsingh, Isaac. (1834). Nihon Ōdai Ichiran; ou,  Annales des empereurs du Japon.  Paris: Royal Asiatic Society, Oriental Translation Fund of Great Britain and Ireland. OCLC 5850691
 Varley, H. Paul. (1980). A Chronicle of Gods and Sovereigns: Jinnō Shōtōki of Kitabatake Chikafusa. New York: Columbia University Press. ;  OCLC 6042764

External links
 National Diet Library, "The Japanese Calendar" -- historical overview plus illustrative images from library's collection

Japanese eras
8th century in Japan
715 beginnings
717 endings